Asyut (from   ) is the capital of the modern Asyut Governorate in Egypt. It was built close to the ancient city of the same name, which is situated nearby. The city is home to one of the largest Coptic Catholic churches in the country.

History

Names and etymology 
The name of the city is derived from early Egyptian Zawty (Z3JW.TJ) (late Egyptian, Səyáwt) adopted into the Coptic as Syowt  , which means "Guardian" of the northern approach of Upper Egypt. In Graeco-Roman Egypt, it was called Lycopolis or Lykopolis (""), ('wolf city') Lycon, or Lyco.

Ancient Asyut 

Ancient Asyut was the capital of the Thirteenth Nome of Upper Egypt (Lycopolites Nome) around 3100 BC. It was located on the western bank of the Nile. The two most prominent gods of ancient Egyptian Asyut were Anubis and Wepwawet, both funerary deities.

During the First Intermediate Period, the rulers of "Zawty" (Khety I, Tefibi, and Khety II) were supporters of the Herakleopolitan kings, of whose domain the Nome formed the southern limits. The conflict between this Nome and the southern Nomes under the rule of the Eleventh Dynasty ended with the victory of Thebes and the decline of Asyut's importance.

Lycopolis has no remarkable ruins, but in the excavated chambers of the adjacent rocks mummies of wolves have been found, confirming the origin of its name, as well as a tradition preserved by Diodorus Siculus, to the effect that an Ethiopian army, invading Egypt, was repelled beyond the city of Elephantine by packs of wolves. Osiris was worshipped under the symbol of a wolf at Lycopolis. According to a myth, he had come "from the shades" as a wolf to aid Isis and Horus in their combat with Typhon. Other ancient Egyptian monuments discovered in Asyut include; the Asyut necropolis (west of the modern city), tombs which date to dynasties Nine, Ten and Twelve, and the Ramessid tombs of Siese and Amenhotep.

In Graeco-Roman times, there was a distinct dialect of Coptic spoken in Asyut, known as "Lycopolitan", after the Greek name for the city. Lesser-used names for this dialect are "Sub-Akhmimic" and "Assiutic".

A large Byzantine Treasure was discovered near the city in the early twentieth century and is now dispersed amongst a number of museums in the West. The hoard is composed of some of the most elaborate jewellery to survive from late antiquity.

Asyut was at the end of the 40 Day Road that connected the city to Darfur through the Selima and Kharga Oases. The history of the road, known by local herders as Darb al-Arba'in, goes back over 700 years. It was used as a pathway for great caravans of up to 12,000 camels at its peak in the 14th century.

Modern Asyut 
Today, the city of Asyut has almost 400,000 inhabitants. It is the Egyptian city with one of the highest Coptic Christian concentration of approximately 50%. It is also home to the Assiut University, one of the largest universities in Egypt, to the Assiut Barrage, and to the Lillian Trasher Orphanage.

The city is one of the only cities in the world that still makes silver appliqué-work shawls and is home to a large textile industry. The city also produces fine pottery, inlaid woodwork, and rugs.

Asyut is the terminus of the Ras Shukheir-Asyut oil pipeline, the terminus of the Cairo-Asyut gas pipeline and the beginning of the proposed Asyut-Qena gas pipeline, the last two being part of the Nile Valley Gas Company Pipeline Project. Aysut is next to the Aysut Dam across the Nile river in the neighboring port of Al-Hamra. The dam was built in 1902 and a hydroelectric plant was added in the 1980s.

Coptic Catholic Eparchy 
On 10 August 1947, a Coptic Catholic eparchy (Eastern Catholic Diocese) of Assiut (or Lycopolis) was established on southern Egyptian territory split off from the Coptic Catholic Eparchy of Luqsor, each suffragan of Coptic Catholic Patriarch of Alexandria. Its episcopal see is the cathedral of the Mother of Divine Love, in Assyut.

Suffragan Eparchs (Bishops) of Assiut
(all Coptic Rite)
 Alexandros Scandar (9 August 1947 – death 29 December 1964)
 Youhanna Nueir, Friars Minor (O.F.M.) (26 March 1965 – retired 20 March 1990); previously Auxiliary Eparch of Luqsor of the Copts (Egypt) (8 December 1955 – 26 March 1965) & Titular Bishop of Phatanus (8 December 1955 – 26 March 1965)
 Kyrillos Kamal William Samaan, O.F.M. (16 May 1990 – present)

 Geography 
 Climate 
Köppen-Geiger climate classification system classifies its climate as hot desert (BWh). It is the driest city of Egypt.  Luxor, Minya, Qena and Asyut have the widest difference of temperatures between days and nights of any city in Egypt, with almost  difference. The city of Asyut is sandwiched between two mountain ranges of about 600m height. There is also a lowering in elevation in mid Egypt, from the Mediterranean and the Red Sea. This gives the city and nearby towns and villages the similar properties of a continental climate, meaning that the city has harsh and chilly cold winter weather, and very hot but non-humid summers. During summer the temperature can exceed . Yet, in winter Asyut gets below  temperatures during the night and frost can easily form, while hail or snow are rare because of the low average of the city's precipitation and general low humidity.

 Culture 
The Alexan Pasha Palace was constructed in 1910 as a riverside residence of a local aristocratic family. It remained in possession of the family until 1995 when it was sold to the state. There are plans to restore the mansion and turn it into a museum. 

 Notable people
 Plotinus, Neoplatonic philosopher 204 or 205 – 270 CE.
 Coluthus, 5th century Greek poet.
 Pope Shenouda III, Pope and Patriarch of the Egyptian Orthodox Church in Egypt and All Middle East.
 Gamal Abdel Nasser, the second Egyptian president.
 Samir Ghanem, a comedian, singer, and entertainer.
 Ahmed Lutfi el-Sayed, Egyptian nationalist.
 Melitius of Lycopolis, founder of the Melitians.
 al-Suyuti, a Sunni Muslim theologian who died in 1505.
 Ali El-Araby, footballer.
 Umar Makram, a revolutionary & noble.

 Twinnings 
  Iaşi, Romania

 See also 
 List of ancient Egyptian towns and cities
 Tulle bi telli

 Notes 

 References 

 

 Bibliography 
 Loprieno, Antonio: Ancient Egyptian A Linguistic Introduction, Oxford University Press 1996. 
 Baines & Malek Cultural Atlas of Ancient Egypt, 2000. 
 Kahl, Jochem: "Ancient Asyut: The first Synthesis after Three Hundred Years of Research", The Asyut Project vol. I''. Wiesbaden 2008.

External links 
 
 

 
Cities in Egypt
Governorate capitals in Egypt
Populated places in Asyut Governorate
Cities in ancient Egypt
Coptic Catholic Church
Titular sees of the Coptic Orthodox Church of Alexandria
Populated places established in the 4th millennium BC
4th-millennium BC establishments
Former populated places in Egypt
Tourist attractions in Egypt